Kyle Allen (born March 8, 1996) is an American football quarterback for the Buffalo Bills of the National Football League (NFL). A native of Scottsdale, Arizona, he played high school football at Desert Mountain and was among the top football players of his class. He played college football at Texas A&M before transferring to Houston in 2016.

Allen signed with the Carolina Panthers as an undrafted free agent following graduation in 2018. That same year, he started the final game of the season following injuries to both Cam Newton and Taylor Heinicke, as well as for the majority of the 2019 season after Newton suffered another injury. He was traded to Washington in 2020 and started four games before breaking his ankle and missing the rest of the season.

High school career
Allen attended Desert Mountain High School in Scottsdale, Arizona. He was teammates with Baltimore Ravens tight end Mark Andrews. During his high school career, he passed for over 8,000 yards and had 86 passing touchdowns. Allen was a five-star recruit by Rivals.com and was ranked as the best pro-style quarterback and seventh best player overall in his class. He was highly recruited out of high school, receiving offers from several schools to play college football before committing to Texas A&M in June 2013. Allen played for the West team in the 2014 U.S. Army All-American Bowl, setting an Army Bowl record at the time with 183 passing yards.

College career

Texas A&M

2014

As a true freshman in 2014, Allen competed with Kenny Hill before the season for the starting quarterback position. Hill would win the job with Allen appearing in games as a backup. After the team lost three straight games in October, the competition was opened again prior to the game against Louisiana-Monroe, and Allen won the starting quarterback position.

On September 14, 2014, he made his first appearance with the Aggies and threw for 122 yards, two touchdowns, and an interception. Allen helped lead the unranked Aggies past the #3 Auburn Tigers with for 277 yards and four touchdowns along with one interception in a 41–38 win, ending Auburn's chances of making the playoffs and putting A&M back in the Top 25.

Allen would finish the season with a 3–2 win–loss record, including a Liberty Bowl win. He earned the MVP award for the bowl game. He finished his freshman season with 118 completions off 192 attempts, 1,322 passing yards, 16 touchdowns, and seven interceptions.

2015

Following the transfer of Kenny Hill to Texas Christian University, Allen was positioned to be the starter for the Aggies in 2015. On August 24 during the 2015 off-season, Allen was named the starting quarterback against Arizona State with competition from incoming freshman Kyler Murray.

Texas A&M got off to a 5–0 start, as Allen led the SEC in passing efficiency. Then, against Alabama, he threw three interceptions that were returned for touchdowns in a 41–23 loss. During that game, on Oct 16, he had a 50 percent completion rate. He went 12-for-34 passing (35.3 percent passing completion rate) for 88 yards in a 23–3 loss to Ole Miss on Oct. 24. The Friday before the following game, head coach Kevin Sumlin named Murray the starter and Allen started to practice with the third team.

Against Alabama, Allen said he suffered an AC sprain in his throwing shoulder but told the coaching staff he was well enough to face Ole Miss. Allen would then miss playing in the 35–28 win on Oct 31 against South Carolina and the Aggies loss to Auburn (26–10). Murray would start in both of those games and a home win over Western Carolina. Allen would return as the starter on Nov 21, a 25–0 win over Vanderbilt. He played his last game with the Aggies on November 28, 2015, completing 15/28 passes for 161 yards and a touchdown in a 7–19 loss to LSU. He finished his second year with completing 160/283 passes for 2,210 yards, 17 touchdowns, and 7 interceptions. Allen also ran for 65 yards and 2 touchdowns.

On December 10, 2015, Allen announced he would be transferring from Texas A&M. This decision made him unavailable to play in the Aggies' Music City bowl game. Allen ended his Aggies career with 278 completions in 475 attempts (58.5%), 3,532 passing yards, 33 passing touchdowns, and 14 interceptions in 20 games.

Houston

2016

Allen announced on January 5, 2016, that he intended to transfer to the University of Houston. Allen began classes at Houston on January 19, but was not eligible to play for the Cougars during the 2016 season due to NCAA transfer guidelines that require transfers to sit out an entire year.

2017

Allen began the 2017 season as the starting quarterback for the Houston Cougars.  His first game was a 19–16 victory by the Cougars over the Arizona Wildcats on September 9, 2017.

Allen then was benched in favor of Kyle Postma during Houston's third game against Texas Tech after throwing four interceptions in three games. On January 11, 2018, Allen announced his decision to forgo his final year of eligibility and declared for the 2018 NFL Draft.

Statistics

Professional career

Carolina Panthers

2018
On April 28, 2018, Allen signed with the Carolina Panthers as an undrafted free agent. He was waived on September 1, 2018, and was signed to the Panthers practice squad the next day. He was released on September 10, 2018. He was re-signed to the Panthers practice squad on October 30, 2018. On December 20, 2018, Allen was promoted to the active roster to back up Taylor Heinicke after starter Cam Newton was shut down for the season. On December 23, 2018, he made his NFL debut against the Atlanta Falcons in relief for an injured Heinicke going 4-of-4 with 38 yards in his two drives before Heinicke came back into the game at the two minute warning of the first half. Allen would go on to make his first NFL start in the last game of the season against the New Orleans Saints. He went 16-of-27 with 228 passing yards, with two passing touchdowns and one rushing touchdown. He suffered an injury early in the fourth quarter and was relieved by Garrett Gilbert.

2019
Allen made his first start of the season in Week 3 against the Arizona Cardinals due to a foot injury to Cam Newton. Allen threw for 261 yards, four touchdowns, and no interceptions as the Panthers won 38–20. In the following game against the Houston Texans, he went 24-of-34 for 232 passing yards in the 16–10 victory. He helped lead the Panthers to victories over the Jacksonville Jaguars and Tampa Bay Buccaneers over the following two weeks. In all during the first five games he started, he threw 9 touchdown passes with zero interceptions and secured five victories. In Week 8 against the San Francisco 49ers, Allen threw for 158 yards and three interceptions as the Panthers lost 51–13. In Week 11 against the Atlanta Falcons, Allen finished with 325 passing yards and four interceptions as the Panthers lost 29–3.
Allen's performance improved drastically in the following week against the New Orleans Saints. In the game, Allen threw for 256 yards and 3 touchdowns in the 34–31 loss. In Week 15 against the Seattle Seahawks, Allen threw for 277 yards, one touchdown, and three interceptions during the 30–24 loss. On December 16, 2019, one day after the game, the Panthers announced that Allen would be benched for rookie quarterback Will Grier in Week 16 against the Indianapolis Colts.
In Week 17 against the New Orleans Saints, Allen entered the game during the second quarter after Grier left the game due to a foot injury. Allen threw for 295 yards and an interception in the 42–10 loss. In total during the 2019 season, Allen appeared in 13 games and recorded 3,322 passing yards, 17 touchdowns, and 16 interceptions.

Washington Football Team

2020

On March 24, 2020, Allen was traded to the Washington Football Team for a fifth-round pick in the 2020 NFL Draft. The trade reunited him with former Panthers head coach Ron Rivera, who became Washington's new head coach that season. Allen was named the starter after Dwayne Haskins was benched prior to their Week 5 game against the Los Angeles Rams. Against the Rams, he ran for a touchdown before missing the rest of the game after suffering a helmet-to-helmet hit by Jalen Ramsey in the second quarter. He returned the following week and started the next few games until he suffered a dislocated ankle in Week 9 against the New York Giants, and he was placed on injured reserve shortly after.

2021
Washington placed an exclusive-rights free agent tender on Allen on March 10, 2021, which he signed on March 18. Allen played for the first time in the 2021 season in the Week 14 loss against the Dallas Cowboys, in relief of Taylor Heinicke who left the game in the fourth quarter due to injury. In the loss, Allen had four completions out of nine pass attempts for 52 yards, eleven rushing yards, and one lost fumble recovered by Dallas. On December 15, 2021, he was placed on the COVID-19 reserve list and placed back on the active roster nine days later.

Houston Texans
On March 23, 2022, Allen signed a one-year, $2.5 million contract with the Houston Texans. Following the team's week 11 loss to the Washington Commanders, Allen was named the team's starter over Davis Mills. Allen would start the next two games, against the Miami Dolphins and Cleveland Browns, before being benched in favor of Mills; in his two starts, Allen threw two touchdowns to four interceptions and lost a fumble that was returned for a touchdown.

Buffalo Bills
On March 16, 2023, Allen signed a one-year contract with the Buffalo Bills.

NFL career statistics

References

External links

Houston Texans bio
Texas A&M Aggies bio
Houston Cougars bio

1996 births
American football quarterbacks
Buffalo Bills players
Carolina Panthers players
Houston Cougars football players
Houston Texans players
Living people
Players of American football from Scottsdale, Arizona
Texas A&M Aggies football players
Washington Football Team players